Oak is an at-grade light rail station on the W Line of the RTD Rail system. It is located near the intersection of West Colfax Avenue and Oak Street, after which the station is named, in Lakewood, Colorado. The station is located within the Lakewood Industrial Park.

The station opened on April 26, 2013,  on the West Corridor, built as part of the Regional Transportation District (RTD) FasTracks public transportation expansion plan and voter-approved sales tax increase for the Denver metropolitan area.

The area around station has seen transit-oriented development. A large complex of Terumo offices, the headquarters for the company's Blood and Cell Technologies division, opened inside the Lakewood Industrial Park in 2015. The Oak Street Station Apartments, a  retail and housing development, opened in 2020.

The station has a multi-gate bus transfer plaza served by RTD Bus routes and a 200 space park and ride lot.

References 

Transportation in Lakewood, Colorado
RTD light rail stations
W Line (RTD)
Railway stations in the United States opened in 2013
2013 establishments in Colorado
Transportation buildings and structures in Jefferson County, Colorado